Electoral autocracy is a hybrid regime, in which democratic institutions are imitative and adhere to authoritarian methods. In these regimes, regular elections are held, but they fail to reach democratic standards of freedom and fairness.

Electoral autocracies around the world

Hungary's Orbán regime 

In September 2022 the European Parliament passed a resolution that due to "a breakdown in democracy, the rule of law and fundamental rights in Hungary" the country turned into "a hybrid regime of electoral autocracy".

See also 
 Authoritarian democracy
 Democratic backsliding
 Embedded democracy
 Hybrid institutions and governance
 Illiberal democracy
 Semi-democracy

References 

Political systems
Types of democracy